Be Somebody is a 2021 Chinese comedy mystery film directed by Liuxun Zimo and produced by Han Han. The film stars Yin Zheng, Deng Jiajia, Yu Entai, Yang Haoyu, Zhang Benyu, and Ke Da. The film follows the story of a group of frustrated filmmakers who gather to plan on a new film about a notorious criminal case. The film premiered in China on 11 November 2021.

Cast
 Yin Zheng as Li Jiahui
 Deng Jiajia as Su Mengdie
 Yu Entai as Zheng Qianli
 Yang Haoyu as Guan Jingnian
 Zhang Benyu as Qi Leshan
 Ke Da as Chen Xiaoda
 Chen Minghao as Lu Ziye
 Qin Xiaoxian as Da Hai
 Deng Enxi as Ye Ying
 Yu Ailei as Man in black
 Bai Ke as worker
 Winston Chao as boss

Songs

Release
Be Somebody was released on 11 November 2021 in China.

Reception
Douban, a major Chinese media rating site, gave the drama 7.6 out of 10.

Box office
Be Somebody earned a total of ¥300 million ($46.93 million) in its first 9 days of release. On 27 November, it grossed more than ¥500 million ($78.22 million) at the box office. As of November 27, the film's accumulated grossed reached 500 million yuan ($78.22 million). As of January 30, 2022, the film has accumulated a gross of 927 million CNY ($145.7 million).

References

Hello

External links

2021 films
2020s Mandarin-language films
Chinese comedy mystery films
2020s comedy mystery films